Hyegwan (Japanese:  was a priest who came across the sea from Goguryeo to Japan in the Asuka period. He is known for introducing the Chinese Buddhist school of Sanlun to Japan.

Hyegwan studied under Jizang and learned Sanron. In 625 (the 33rd year of Empress Suiko), he was dispatched to Japan by an order of King Yeongnyu of Goguryeo, and became the founding patriarch of Japanese Sanron. He lived at Gangō-ji (元興寺 Gangō temple) by an Imperial command. However, Gyōnen wrote that Hyegwan did not lecture on Sanron or start the Japanese tradition, although he "held the jade" (i.e., possessed knowledge of the teachings).

Notes

References 
 Ronald S. Green and Chanju Mun Gyōnen's Transmission of the Buddha Dharma in Three Countries, Leiden: Brill, 2018. p. 120-121.
 Sueki, Fumihiko 末木文美士: "The Sanron School in Japan: A Study of a Chapter of Gyōnen's Sangoku Buppō Denzū Engi" 「三國佛法傅通縁起」日本三論宗章研究, The Memoirs of the Institute of Oriental Culture 東洋文化研究所紀要, No.99, 1986-02, p. 71-151.

Korean Buddhist monks
Goguryeo Buddhist monks
Sanron Buddhist monks
Asuka period Buddhist clergy